Disco Fantasy is the third and final album by the former Santana and Azteca band member Coke Escovedo. Produced by Patrick Gleeson, it was released in 1977 on Mercury Records.

Track listing
"Doesn't Anybody Want to Hear a Love Song" - (Dennis Geyer)  3:27
"Disco Fantasy" - (Mark Phillips)  3:24
"Hot Soul Single" - (Mark Phillips)  3:35
"Who Do You Want to Love" - (Mark Phillips)  4:04
"Won't You Gimme The Funk" - (Mark Phillips)  3:33
"Trash Man" - (Herman Eberitzsch)  4:46
"Something Special" - (Herman Eberitzsch)  4:12
"Your Kind of Loving" - (Mark Phillips)  3:05
"Soul Support" - (Herman Eberitzsch)  4:17

Personnel
Coke Escovedo - Timbales, Congas, Percussion, Vocals
Harvey Mason - Drums
Paul Jackson - Bass
Hugh McCracken, Tom Rotella  - Guitar
Patrick Gleeson, Roger Smith  - Keyboards
Emilio Castillo - Tenor Saxophone
Stephen Kupka - Baritone Saxophone 
Mic Gillette - Trombone Trumpet
Lenny Pickett - Alto Saxophone, Tenor Saxophone, Lyricon (Eu-lyricon)
Greg Adams - Trumpet
Linda Tillery - Lead Vocals
Gwen Owens, Julia Tillman, Maxine Willard - Backing Vocals

Charts

References

External links
 Coke Escovedo-Disco Fantasy at Discogs

1977 albums
Coke Escovedo albums
Mercury Records albums